Patrick Joseph O'Loughlin (29 October 1873 – 14 August 1956) was an Australian rules footballer who played for the Essendon Football Club in the Victorian Football League (VFL). In the first year of competition, 1897, he became one of the club's and league's first premiership players. O'Loughlin made his VFL debut against  in round 1 of the season at Corio Oval.

References

External links

O'Loughlin, Pat; Past Player Profiles, Essendon Football Club
 

1873 births
1956 deaths
Essendon Football Club players
Essendon Football Club Premiership players
Brunswick Football Club players
Australian rules footballers from Melbourne
One-time VFL/AFL Premiership players
People from Heidelberg, Victoria